is a former Grand Prix motorcycle road racer. His best seasons were in 2000, when he finished second in the 125cc world championship behind Roberto Locatelli and in 2001, when he finished second behind Manuel Poggiali. With his 6 Grand Prix victories in 2001, Ui tied a record set by Kenny Roberts in 1983 of most wins by a rider without winning a championship. He raced in Japan in 2007, winning the All Japan 250cc Road Race Championship.

By season

Grand Prix motorcycle racing

Races by year
(key) (Races in bold indicate pole position, races in italics indicate fastest lap)

References 

Japanese motorcycle racers
125cc World Championship riders
250cc World Championship riders
MotoGP World Championship riders
1972 births
Living people
Sportspeople from Chiba Prefecture